I Do Not Want What I Haven't Got is the second album by Irish singer Sinéad O'Connor, released in March 1990 on Ensign/Chrysalis Records. It contains O'Connor's version of the Prince song "Nothing Compares 2 U", which was released as a single and reached number one in multiple countries. The album was nominated for four Grammy Awards in 1991, including Record of the Year, Best Female Pop Vocal Performance, and Best Music Video, Short Form for "Nothing Compares 2 U", winning the award for Best Alternative Music Performance.  However, O'Connor refused to accept the nominations and award.

Content
The critically acclaimed album contains O'Connor's most famous single, "Nothing Compares 2 U", which was one of the best selling singles in the world in 1990, topping the charts in many countries including the United States, United Kingdom and Canada. This rendition of the Prince song reflected on O'Connor's mother, who had lost her life in an auto accident five years earlier. The single "Emperor's New Clothes" found moderate success, although it did top the Modern Rock Tracks chart in the US.

The first song on the album, "Feel So Different", starts with The Serenity Prayer by Reinhold Niebuhr. The album also includes O'Connor's rendition of "I Am Stretched on Your Grave", an anonymous 17th century poem that was written in Irish, translated into English by Frank O'Connor, and composed by musician Philip King in 1979. O'Connor's version uses a loop of "Funky Drummer" by James Brown.

Critical reception

I Do Not Want What I Haven't Got received critical acclaim. In 2012, it was ranked number 408 on Rolling Stone magazine's list of the 500 greatest albums of all time. The album was ranked number 457 on the 2020 edition of the list.

Track listing

Original Release

Bonus Disc (2009)

Personnel
Credits adapted from the album's liner notes.
Sinéad O'Connor – vocals, acoustic guitar, electric guitar, keyboards, programming, arranger, producer, string arrangements
Marco Pirroni – guitar on "The Emperor's New Clothes"
David Munday – acoustic guitar and piano on "You Cause As Much Sorrow"
Andy Rourke – bass guitar on "The Emperor's New Clothes", "Jump in the River" and "You Cause As Much Sorrow", acoustic guitar on "Jump in the River"
Jah Wobble – bass guitar on "The Last Day of Our Acquaintance" 
John Reynolds – drums and percussion on "The Emperor's New Clothes", "You Cause As Much Sorrow" and "The Last Day of Our Acquaintance" 
Kieran Kiely – keyboards, accordion, piano
Steve Wickham – fiddle on "I Am Stretched on Your Grave"
The Muses – backing vocals
Philip King – vocals, melody arrangement
Nick Ingman – conductor, orchestra director, string arrangement on "Feel So Different"
Karl Wallinger – arranger

Technical
Nellee Hooper – co-producer on "Nothing Compare 2 U"
Chris Birkett, Sean Devitt – engineers
Dave Hoffman, Dominique Le Rigoleur – photography
John Maybury – cover design

Charts

Weekly charts

Year-end charts

Certifications and sales

!scope="row"|Worldwide
|
|7,000,000
|-

References

1990 albums
Sinéad O'Connor albums
Albums produced by Nellee Hooper
Grammy Award for Best Alternative Music Album